The 1981-82 Georgia Tech Yellow Jackets men's basketball team represented the Georgia Institute of Technology. Led by first-year head coach Bobby Cremins, the team finished the season with an overall record of 10-16 (3-11 ACC).

Roster

Schedule and results

References 

Georgia Tech Yellow Jackets men's basketball seasons
Georgia Tech
1981 in sports in Georgia (U.S. state)
1982 in sports in Georgia (U.S. state)